Universal TV is a German pay-tv-channel, which is operated by NBCUniversal and headquartered in Munich. The station was announced on May 22, 2013, and launched on September 5, 2013.

In the course of the global renaming of Universal Channel into Universal TV, the channel was renamed in Germany on July 2, 2018.

Programming
The programme consists of a mixture of feature films and series, the latter being the major part of the program. The station's prime time starts at 9 pm and is filled, among other things, by exclusive first broadcastings. The complete program is also available in the original version, in addition to German synchronization. In addition to series already broadcast on other stations, German-language first-time broadcasts are also offered.

Current

Bones (Bones – Die Knochenjägerin) (2022-present)
Burden of Truth (2020-present)
Castle (2013-2014, 2016–present)
Charmed (Charmed – Zauberhafte Hexen	) (2022-present)
Chicago Fire (2013–present)
Chicago Med (2016–present)
Desperate Housewives (2022-present)
Nurses (2020-present)
Outlander (2021-present)
The Magicians (2022-present)

Former

'Til Death (Ehe ist...) (2015–2017)
According to Jim (Immer wieder Jim - Jim hat immer Recht!) (2016–2019)
Anger Management (2015–2017)
Baby Daddy (2014–2017)
Bates Motel (2013–2017)
Chicago Justice (2017)
Devious Maids (Devious Maids - Schmutzige Geheimnisse) (2014–2017)
Ghost Whisperer (Ghost Whisperer - Stimmen aus dem Jenseits) (2013-2015)
Go On (2013, 2015–2017)
Kojak (2018–2019, 2021)
Law & Order: Criminal Intent (Criminal Intent - Verbrechen im Visier) (2013–2022)
Law & Order: Special Victims Unit (2013–2018)
Life (2014–2017)
Medium (Medium  - Nichts bleibt verborgen) (2015–2017)
Melissa & Joey (2014-2016)
Monk (2016–2021)
Psych (2014–2021)
Rake (2014, 2016)
Royal Pains (2016-2017)
Secrets and Lies (2015-2016)
State of Affairs (2015-2016)
Superstore (2016–2019)
The Catch (2017–2019)
The Driver (2015-2016)
The Goldbergs (Die Goldbergs) (2016–2017)
The Librarians (The Quest) (2015–2020)
Weeds (Weeds - Kleine Deals unter Nachbarn) (2014)
Young Hercules (Der junge Hercules) (2014-2016)

Logos

Audience share

Germany

References

External links
 

Television stations in Germany
Television stations in Austria
Television stations in Switzerland
Television channels and stations established in 2013
Universal Networks International
Mass media in Munich